Martin Wallace may refer to:

 Martin Wallace (American football) (born 1990), American football player
 Martin Wallace (bishop) (born 1948), Bishop of Selby
 Martin Wallace (game designer), English game designer
 Martin Wallace (soldier) (born 1969), Australian SASR soldier
 Martin Kelso Wallace (1898–1978), Lord Mayor of Belfast
 Martin R. M. Wallace (1829–1902), American Union brevet brigadier general